Addison is an Old English given name whose etymological meaning is "son of Adam". Originally a masculine name from 1600’s Scotland, Addison has become an increasingly feminine name since the 1990’s in the US while remaining strictly masculine in the Latin and German speaking countries.

Notable people with the given name "Addison" include

A
Addison Alves (born 1981), Brazilian footballer

B
Addison Bain, American scientist
Addison Baker (1907–1943), American pilot
Addison Brown (1830–1913), American judge
Addison Burkhardt (1879–1937), American lyricist

C
Addison Caldwell (1856–1910), American teacher
Addison Clark (1842–1911), American academic administrator
Addison B. Colvin (1858–1939), American businessman
Addison Cresswell (disambiguation), multiple people

D
Addison Dale (born 1942), Zimbabwean weightlifter

F
Addison Farmer (1928–1963), American musician
Addison Fatta (born 2004), American artistic gymnast
Addison Fischer, American businessman
Addison G. Foster (1837–1917), American politician

G
Addison Gardiner (1797–1883), American lawyer and politician
Addison Garnett (born 1996), English footballer
Addison Gayle (1932–1991), American professor
Addison Grace (born 2001), American singer-songwriter
Addison Groove (born 1942), English musical artist

H
Addison C. Harris (1840–1916), American lawyer
Addison Hehr (1909–1971), American art director
Addison Hewlett (1912–1989), American politician
Addison J. Hodges (1842–1933), American soldier
Addison Holley (born 2000), Canadian actress
Addison Hosea (1914–1985), American prelate
Addison Hutton (1834–1916), American architect

J
Addison James (1849–1910), American politician
Addison P. Jones (1822–1910), American politician

K
Addison Kelly (1875–1942), American football player
Addison Kimball, American architect

L
Addison H. Laflin (1823–1878), American politician
Addison Lockley (born 1991), English rugby union footballer

M
Addison S. McClure (1839–1903), American lawyer and politician
Addison W. Merrill (1842–1920), American politician
Addison Mizner (1872–1933), American architect
Addison Webster Moore (1866–1930), American philosopher
Addison Mitchell McConnell, American lawyer and politician

N
Addison Niles (1832–1890), American judge
Addison H. Nordyke, American industrialist

O
Addison O'Dea (born 1979), American filmmaker

P
Addison Powell (1921–2010), American actor
Addison Pratt (1802–1872), American missionary
Addison G. Pulsifer (1874–??), American architect

R
Addison Rae (born 2000), American social media personality
Addison Reed (born 1988), American baseball player
Addison Rerecich (1999–2019), American social figure
Addison Richards (1902–1964), American actor
Addison Richards (Canadian football) (born 1993), Canadian football player
Addison Roache (1817–1906), American judge
Addison Russell (born 1994), American baseball player
Addison Peale Russell (1826–1912), American author

S
Addison N. Scurlock (1883–1964), American photographer
Addison T. Smith (1862–1956), American politician
Addison E. Southard (1884–1970), American diplomat
Addison Spruill (born 1993), American basketball player
Addison Langhorne Steavenson (1836–1913), English engineer
Addison Steiner (born 1994), American soccer player

T
Addison Teague, American sound editor
Addison Timlin (born 1991), American actress

V
Addison Van Name (1835–1922), American librarian
Addison Emery Verrill (1839–1926), American zoologist

W
Addison White (1824–1909), American politician
Addison Wiggin, American publisher

Fictional characters
Addison Montgomery, a character on the television series Grey's Anatomy
 Addison Wells, main character in the film, Zombies (2018 film) and its sequel, Zombies 2 and will be in its third and final installment, Zombies 3.

See also
Addison (disambiguation), a disambiguation page for "Addison"
Addison (surname), a page for people surnamed "Addison"
Adyson (disambiguation)

References 

English masculine given names
English feminine given names
English unisex given names